Ribosome biogenesis protein BOP1 is a protein that in humans is encoded by the BOP1 gene.

Function 

It is a WD40 repeat-containing nucleolar protein involved in rRNA processing, thereby controlling the cell cycle. It is required for the maturation of the 25S and 5.8S ribosomal RNAs. It may serve as an essential factor in ribosome formation that coordinates processing of the spacer regions in pre-rRNA. The Pes1-Bop1 complex has several components: BOP1, GRWD1, PES1, ORC6L, and RPL3 and is involved in ribosome biogenesis and altered chromosome segregation. The overexpression of BOP1 increases the percentage of multipolar spindles in human cells. Deregulation of the BOP1 pathway may contribute to colorectal tumourigenesis in humans. Elevated levels of Bop1 induces Bop1/WDR12 and Bop1/Pes1 subcomplexes and the assembly and integrity of the PeBoW complex is highly sensitive to changes in Bop1 protein levels.

Nop7p-Erb1p-Ytm1p, found in yeast, is potentially the homologous complex of Pes1-Bop1-WDR12 as it is involved in the control of ribosome biogenesis and S phase entry. The integrity of the PeBoW complex is required for ribosome biogenesis and cell proliferation in mammalian cells. In Giardia, the species specific cytoskeleton protein, beta-giardin, interacts with Bop1.

Structure 

BOP1 contains a conserved N-terminal domain, BOP1NT.

References

External links

Further reading

Protein domains